River of Romance is a 1929 American drama film directed by Richard Wallace and written by Ethel Doherty, Joseph L. Mankiewicz, Dan Totheroh and John V.A. Weaver. The film stars Charles "Buddy" Rogers, Mary Brian, June Collyer, Henry B. Walthall, Wallace Beery, Fred Kohler and Natalie Kingston. It is based on the play Magnolia by Booth Tarkington. The film was released on June 29, 1929, by Paramount Pictures.

Plot
In 1830s Mississippi, Tom Rumsford (Charles "Buddy" Rogers) comes back to Magnolia Landing, his Parents' estate. Having been brought up in the north by Quaker relatives, he just hates violence and accordingly refuses a duel. As this is the only way in the south to settle a dispute between gentleman, Tom's father is so infuriated by his behavior that tom has no other choice but leave. Away from Magnolia Landing, Tom learns bravery and returns seven years later as "the notorious Colonel Blake" the terror of the Lower Mississippi...

Cast 
Charles "Buddy" Rogers as Tom Rumford
Mary Brian as Lucy Jeffers
June Collyer as Elvira Jeffers
Henry B. Walthall as General Jeff Rumford
Wallace Beery as General Orlando Jackson
Fred Kohler as Captain Blackie
Natalie Kingston as Mexico
Walter McGrail as Major Patterson
Anderson Lawler as Joe Patterson
Percy Haswell as Madame Rumford
George H. Reed as Rumbo

References

External links 
 

1929 films
1920s English-language films
1929 drama films
Paramount Pictures films
Films set in Mississippi
Films based on works by Booth Tarkington
Films directed by Richard Wallace
American black-and-white films
1920s American films